Animal breeding (disambiguation) may refer to:
Animal breeding, the breeding of animals by humans
Captive breeding
Breeding in the wild